Murder Games may refer to:
"Murder Games", a song by Badflower from the album OK, I'm Sick
Murder Games, a 2017 novel by James Patterson and Howard Roughan. See James Patterson bibliography#With Howard Roughan.